Another Time, Another Place is a 1958 British melodrama film directed by Lewis Allen and starring Lana Turner, Barry Sullivan and Sean Connery. The film is based on Lenore J. Coffee's 1955 novel Weep No More.

Plot
An American reporter, Sara Scott (Turner) is working in London during the last year of the Second World War and begins an affair with a British reporter named Mark Trevor (Connery). Sara is conflicted on whether to marry her rich American boss Carter Reynolds (Sullivan) or the charming young reporter she is having an affair with. Finally, she chooses Mark, only to find that he is married and has a son back in his hometown. The two separate shortly thereafter, then decide to stay together and work out their problems.

As the war in Europe is ending, Mark is killed in a plane crash, sending Sara into mourning and into a mental sanatorium for a few months. After her release, Carter convinces her to catch a ship back to New York and work for him. However, before her departure, she goes to Trevor's very scenic seaside hometown in Cornwall and lives for a time with his young widow Kay (Johns) and son as she works to fashion Mark's war reporting into a book. She is conflicted about telling Kay the truth about her relationship with Mark, but finally does so, causing Kay to emotionally break down and order Sara to leave. However, she makes amends with Sara at the station.

Cast

Production
Location filming in the fishing village in Cornwall that Lana Turner's character visits, named St Giles in the film, was carried out at Polperro. She travels by train and the station she arrives at, also called St Giles in the film, is actually Looe railway station. The final scene of the film is of her train leaving the same station, which still exists but has been much altered since the 1950s.

Johnny Stompanato incident 
During the film's principal photography in Britain, Connery was confronted on-set by gangster Johnny Stompanato, then-boyfriend of Lana Turner, who suspected the actor was having an affair with Turner. Stompanato pointed a gun at Connery and warned him to keep away from Turner. Connery responded by grabbing the gun out of Stompanato's hand and twisting his wrist, causing him to run off the set.

After Stompanato's death, it was rumoured that a Los Angeles mobster held Connery responsible, causing Connery (who was then in Los Angeles to make Darby O'Gill And The Little People (1959) for Walt Disney) nervously looking over his shoulder for a time.

References

External links
 
 
 

1958 films
1958 drama films
British drama films
British black-and-white films
Films about journalists
Films directed by Lewis Allen
Films scored by Douglas Gamley
Paramount Pictures films
Films with screenplays by Stanley Mann
1950s English-language films
1950s British films